The 2019 Virginia Cavaliers football team represented the University of Virginia during the 2019 NCAA Division I FBS football season. The Cavaliers were led by fourth-year head coach Bronco Mendenhall and played their home games at Scott Stadium. The team competed as members of the Atlantic Coast Conference.

Coming off an 8–5 season in 2018, Virginia was considered the favorite to win the Coastal Division. The Cavaliers began the season with four straight victories, but then lost three games in a four-game stretch to Notre Dame, Miami, and Louisville. The team rebounded with four straight victories to close out the regular season, including a win over rival and 24th-ranked Virginia Tech to secure Virginia's place in the ACC Championship Game. It was Virginia's first win over Virginia Tech since 2003, and it was the school's first appearance in the conference title game, concluding a seven-year stretch in which all seven members of the Coastal Division won the division. In the Championship Game, Virginia lost to Clemson, 62–17. The team received an invitation to the Orange Bowl to play Florida, where they lost 36–28, to end the season with a 9–5 record.

Virginia was led on offense by quarterback Bryce Perkins, who finished with 3,530 passing yards and 22 touchdowns, and was named second-team all-conference. Perkins also led the team in rushing, finishing with 769 yards and 11 touchdowns on the ground. Wide receiver and return specialist Joe Reed was named first-team all-conference as an all-purpose back. On defense, the team's leading tackler and sacks leader was linebacker Zane Zandier.

Preseason

Preseason media poll
In the preseason ACC media poll, Virginia was predicted to win the Coastal Division, but received just one vote out of 173 to win the ACC Championship Game.

Regular season
In September, the Cavaliers defeated the Seminoles for the Jefferson-Eppes Trophy.
In early November, the Cavaliers defeated the Tar Heels in the South's Oldest Rivalry.
In late November, the Cavaliers defeated the Hokies for the Commonwealth Cup.

Bronco Mendenhall became the first coach to bring both trophies to Charlottesville at the same time. The Jefferson-Eppes Trophy may remain in Cavalier hands until at least 2025, as FSU does not appear on the ACC schedules for Virginia through 2024.

As projected by the pre-season media, Virginia won the Coastal division for the first time despite an early season-ending injury to the team's highest NFL prospect, Bryce Hall, in the game against Miami.

Schedule

Personnel

Coaching staff
Staff as of 2019.

Roster

Depth chart

Game summaries

at Pittsburgh

William & Mary

Florida State

Old Dominion

at Notre Dame

at Miami (FL)

Duke

at Louisville

at North Carolina

Georgia Tech

Liberty

Virginia Tech

Clemson (ACC Championship Game)

vs. Florida (Orange Bowl)

Rankings

Players drafted into the NFL

References

Virginia
Virginia Cavaliers football seasons
Virginia Cavaliers football